Tigran Gharabaghtsyan (born 6 June 1984 in Yerevan, Soviet Union) is a retired Armenian football striker. He was a member of the Armenia national team, for which he has twice appeared since his debut in a friendly match against Panama on 14 January 2007.

Achievements
Armenian Premier League with Pyunik Yerevan: 2006, 2007, 2008
Armenian Supercup with Pyunik Yerevan: 2006
Bulgarian Cup finalist with Cherno More Varna: 2008

External links
 
Profile at FFA website

Living people
1984 births
Armenian footballers
Armenia international footballers
Armenia under-21 international footballers
Armenian expatriate footballers
FC Urartu players
FC Pyunik players
PFC Cherno More Varna players
FC Atyrau players
FC Ararat Yerevan players
Armenian Premier League players
First Professional Football League (Bulgaria) players
Expatriate footballers in Bulgaria
Armenian expatriate sportspeople in Bulgaria
Armenian expatriate sportspeople in Kazakhstan
Footballers from Yerevan
Association football forwards